Daniel Lloyd Monson (born October 6, 1961) is an American college basketball coach serving as the head coach at Long Beach State since April 2007. Previously he was head coach at Minnesota for over seven seasons (1999–2006), reaching postseason play five times. Before coaching the Gophers, he was the head coach at Gonzaga for two seasons, leading the Zags on an improbable run to the Elite Eight during his last season.

Early years
Monson is the son of college basketball coach Don Monson, and spent most of his early years in eastern Washington, where his father was a successful high school head coach in Cheney and Pasco for 18 seasons. At age 14, the family moved from Pasco to East Lansing, Michigan, where Don was an assistant coach for Jud Heathcote at Michigan State for two seasons.

They moved to Moscow, Idaho at the start of his junior year, when his father became the head coach of his alma mater, the University of Idaho, in August 1978.  He graduated from Moscow High School in 1980 and played college football a few blocks away as a receiver for the Idaho Vandals, then under head coach Jerry Davitch. Monson suffered a knee injury that ended his playing career, and focused on coaching; he graduated from Idaho with a degree in secondary education (mathematics) in 1985.

Coaching career
After graduation, Monson was a high school coach (and math teacher) in Oregon City for a season, then became a collegiate graduate assistant under Gene Bartow at UAB in 1986, where he earned a master's degree in education.

Gonzaga
Monson began at GU as an assistant coach in 1988 and was elevated to associate head coach under head coach Dan Fitzgerald in 1994; in all, Monson spent eleven years helping build the Gonzaga program. As an assistant, Monson was a key figure in the Bulldogs turnaround during the 1990s. From the time Monson was named associate head coach in 1995, Gonzaga averaged 22 wins per season and reached postseason play every year but one. For all of this, Monson was promoted to head coach of the Zags in 1997.

His first year as head coach at Gonzaga (1997–98) resulted in a 24–10 mark, as the Bulldogs won the West Coast Conference championship and advanced to the second round of the NIT. On their way to setting a school-record with its 24 wins, Monson was named the WCC Coach of the Year and National Rookie Coach of the Year by Basketball Times.

The 1999 team brought Gonzaga basketball to national prominence with an impressive run in the NCAA tournament.  In the West regional, the tenth-seeded Zags defeated 7th-seed Minnesota and second-seed #7 Stanford in the Seattle sub-regional, then sixth-seed Florida in the Sweet Sixteen round in Phoenix. Gonzaga advanced to the regional final (Elite Eight), taking the region's top seed, eventual national champion 
Connecticut, down to the last minute, losing by five points.

While at the helm at Gonzaga, Monson had a  record in his two seasons and won both regular season titles.

Minnesota
Monson became one of the more sought-after coaching candidates in college basketball in the spring of 1999. After Gonzaga's improbable run to the Elite Eight, he signed a new contract in mid-April, then was offered the head coaching position at the University of Minnesota in late July, which he accepted. University president Mark Yudof was hoping that Monson would be able to help the program move past the scandals of previous head coach Clem Haskins. In the previous season, Gonzaga had defeated Minnesota in the first round of the NCAA tournament after several Gopher players were forced to sit out due to an academic fraud investigation.  Mark Few, Monson's top assistant, succeeded him at Gonzaga.  Monson also had ties to Minnesota already, as his father Don was born in rural Menagha.

In April 2002, Monson was courted by the University of Washington in Seattle to coach the Huskies and return to his home state of Washington. Monson initially accepted the offer presented by Huskies AD Barbara Hedges to succeed Bob Bender. The Minnesota athletic department, under Tom Moe, convinced Monson to change his mind and stay on with Minnesota.  In the end, Monson decided to return to Minnesota because he didn't feel he had given enough time to the rebuilding effort at Minnesota and hadn't yet attained enough success with the team. Washington ultimately hired Lorenzo Romar.

Dealing with the fallout from the academic scandals of the Haskins era, it was several years before Monson was able to recruit on equal footing with other Big Ten coaches.  He led the Gophers to one NCAA Tournament and 4 NIT appearances in his 7 full seasons as Gophers coach.  Nonetheless, he was widely praised for cleaning up the program's image.  On November 30, 2006,  Monson resigned as head coach of Minnesota after a 2–5 start and only achieving a single 20-win season in seven.  Assistant coach Jim Molinari was appointed interim head coach before Tubby Smith was named the new head coach after the season. Monson compiled a 118–106 record with the Gophers, giving him an overall career record of 170–123 as a head coach.

Long Beach State
On April 6, 2007, Monson was named the head coach at Long Beach State. The 49ers, now known as The Beach, improved in each of Monson's first several seasons, to the point that on February 24, 2011 Long Beach defeated Cal Poly 61–55 to clinch their first Big West regular season title since 2006–07 and the #1 seed in the Big West tournament.  The following season, Long Beach State won the conference's regular season (15–1) and tournament titles, and advanced to the 2012 NCAA tournament. In all, Monson has led The Beach to postseason play four times, won the Big West Conference men's basketball championship three times, and been named Big West Conference Coach of Year award three times.

Under Monson, The Beach routinely play one of the most difficult non-conference schedules in the nation. The team usually plays the likes of teams such as North Carolina, Duke, Louisville, and Texas. According to Coach Monson this is to prepare the team for Big West conference play and ultimately the NCAA tournament.

Monson has also coached internationally; he was an assistant coach on the 1999 World University Games team and the 2004 USA U-20 team.

In 2018, a poll of Big West assistant coaches named Long Beach State as the "Best Job in the Big West".

The 2021–22 season opener on November 10, 2021 served as a homecoming for Monson, as The Beach traveled to Monson's alma mater of Idaho to play the Vandals in the first regular-season game at Idaho's new home of Idaho Central Credit Union Arena. The Beach won 95–89 in overtime.

Head coaching record

References

External links
 Long Beach State profile

1961 births
Living people
American men's basketball coaches
Basketball coaches from Idaho
Basketball coaches from Washington (state)
College men's basketball head coaches in the United States
Gonzaga Bulldogs men's basketball coaches
High school basketball coaches in the United States
Idaho Vandals football players
Long Beach State Beach men's basketball coaches
Minnesota Golden Gophers men's basketball coaches
People from Moscow, Idaho
People from Pasco, Washington
Players of American football from Idaho
Players of American football from Spokane, Washington
UAB Blazers men's basketball coaches